Soul Diggaz is an American R&B and hip-hop production team composed of Karriem "K-Mack" Mack, Shaun "Bless" Owens and songwriter Corté "The Author" Ellis.

Corté Ellis is the younger cousin of hip hop musician Missy Elliott. They have added celebrity choreographer Bijan RythmiK Williams to the group as talent manager and A&R. The Soul Diggaz are based out of two locations, Midtown Manhattan and Los Angeles, California. They are currently signed to their own production company (Soul Diggaz Entertainment) and Missy Elliott's label, The Goldmind Inc.

Production credits

1999

Mary J. Blige – Mary 
 Can't Believe (featuring Chaka Khan) (unreleased)
 Chasing Lies (unreleased)

2001

Toya – Toya 
 04. The Truth (also co-written)
 08. What Else Can I Do (also co-written)

2003

Beyoncé – Dangerously In Love 
 15. What's It Gonna Be
 Ice Cream (unreleased)

GAP Promo: Into The Hollywood Groove 
 01. Madonna and Missy Elliott – Into The Hollywood Groove

The Fighting Temptations 
 01. Beyoncé, Missy Elliott, MC Lyte and Free – Fighting Temptation
 02. Destiny's Child – I Know

Eve Television 
 00. Missy Elliott – Eve's Theme

Missy Elliott – This Is Not A Test! 
 05. Is This Our Last Time (featuring Fabolous)

Honey: Music from & Inspired by the Motion Picture 
 01. Missy Elliott – Hurt Sumthin'

2004

Barbershop 2: Back in Business 
 12. Olivia – Private Party

Unity: The Official Athens 2004 Olympic Games Album 
 02. Destiny's Child and will.i.am – I Know

2005

Brooke Valentine – Chain Letter 
 02. Taste Of Dis
 05. Cover Girl

Jace – Jace The Name 
 04. The Hood (featuring Chill)

Olivia – Behind Closed Doors 
07. Whateva (featuring Young Buck)

Jully Black – This Is Me 
 01. This Is Me (Intro)
 02. Hurt U Bad
 04. Sweat of Your Brow (featuring Demarco)
 05. Calling You
 06. Stay The Night
 07. Free To Love You
 12. Lovin' You
 14. Gotta Let You Know (Scream)
 15. I Travelled
 16. This Is Me (Outro)
 Sweat Of Your Brow (Soul Diggaz Remix)
 Stay The Night (Soul Diggaz Remix)

O.D.B. – A Son Unique 
 13. Don't Hurt Me

Syleena Johnson – Chapter 3: The Flesh 
 10. Time

Ashlee Simpson – L.O.V.E. CD-Single 
 02. L.O.V.E. (Missy Underground Mix) (featuring Missy Elliott)

2006

Fantasia – Fantasia 
 14. Bump What Ya Friends Say (featuring Missy Elliott)

2007

8Ball & MJG – Ridin' High 
 07. 30 Rock (featuring Diddy)

B5 – Don't Talk, Just Listen 
 01. Hydrolics (featuring Bow Wow)

Bow Wow & Omarion – Face Off 
 04. Hey Baby (Jump Off)

Cheri Dennis – In And Out Of Love 
 03. Portrait of Love

2008

Day26 – Day26 
 09. What It Feels Like

Izza Kizza – Kizzaland 
 02. Flippin' In Rizzide
 03. I'm The Izza Kizza
 06. Wham
 10. Here I Iz
 11. Ooh La La
 16. Me And Keesha (Boy Meets Girl)
 17. Testimonial
 18. Push

Donnie Klang – Just a Rolling Stone 
 02. Take You There (featuring Diddy)
 05. Hollywood Girl

Jessica Betts – Jessie Pearl 
 Moon (co-produced by Missy Elliott)

2009

Nat King Cole – Re:Generations 
 07. Hit That Jive, Jack! (featuring Izza Kizza)

Corté Ellis – TBA 
 Money On The Floor

Cassie – Electro Love 
 Pretty Face

Miss Nana – Little Red Rhyming Hood 
 The Chirp Chirp Song
 My Hood (featuring Yung Kuntry)

Yung Kuntry – TBA 
 Here Comes The Police
 I'm Official

Jada – TBA 
 It's True

Bow Wow – The Green Light Mixtape 
 I'm Dat Nigga (co-Produced By Big AL and Daffy of souldiggaz)

2011

Kelly Rowland – Here I Am 
 12. Each Other

RichGirl – Non Album Track 
 00. You Say

2013

Missy Elliott – Block Party 
 Act a Fool
 All 4 U (featuring Lil Wayne)
 Blow Ya Whistle

Sharaya J – TBA 
 Green Light (featuring Missy Elliott) (co-produced by Missy Elliott)

Unreleased

Jessica Betts 
 You Don't Have To (co-produced by Missy Elliott)

Keyshia Cole 
 Be With You

Mr.Peterson 
 Holla
 Off The Chain
 The Anthem

Nina Sky 
 Good Love

So Def 
 Happy Birthday (featuring Izza Kizza and Missy Elliott) (co-produced by Missy Elliott)

Tanu 
 Secrets

Lady Gaga 
Along with Jeremy Greene & Emoney 3am music group
 Filthy Pop

Also appear on

2003

Missy Elliott – This Is Not A Test! 
 06. I'm Really Hot
 10. Let It Bump

2005

Tweet – It's Me Again 
 07. Things I Don't Mean (featuring Missy Elliott)
 08. My Man
 16. When I Need A Man

2007

Keyshia Cole – Just like You 
 01. Let It Go(featuring Missy Elliott and Lil' Kim)

Corté Ellis writing credits

2004

New Edition – One Love 
 10. One Love Interlude

Fantasia – Free Yourself 
 04. Selfish (I Want U 2 Myself) (featuring Missy Elliott)

2005

Tweet – It's Me Again 
 08. My Man
 13. Steer

2006

Monica – The Makings of Me 
 02. A Dozen Roses (You Remind Me)
 06. Doin' Me Right

Fantasia – Fantasia 
 10. Two Weeks Notice
 Doin' Me Right (unreleased)

2007

Katharine McPhee – Katharine McPhee 
 01. Love Story
 05. Not Ur Girl
 06. Each Other
 07. Dangerous
 Take You There (unreleased)

Ashley Tisdale – Headstrong 
 Hurry Up (unreleased)

B5 – Don't Talk, Just Listen 
 01. Hydrolics (Featuring Bow Wow)

Britney Spears – Blackout 
 06. Get Naked (I Got A Plan)
 15. Get Back

2008

Donnie Klang – Just a Rolling Stone 
 07. Pretty Girls Cry
 11. Which One
 12. Love In Stereo
 00. Take You There
 00. Hollywood Girl

Jennifer Hudson – Jennifer Hudson 
 10 Minutes To Cry (unreleased)

Ali Lohan – Interpersonal 
 05. Close That Door

Samantha Jade – My Name Is Samantha Jade 
 Curious

Also appears on

2004

8Ball & MJG – Living Legends 
 16. Memphis City Blues

References

External links 
Official Website
Official Myspace
Interview, HitQuarters Feb 2006

American record producers
Record production trios
American songwriting teams